Rhizomatiks is a Japanese company which is dedicated to creating large scale commercial and artistic projects using both the arts and technology.  Founded in 2006, the company has members from various fields such as visuals arts, media arts, computer programming, architecture, engineering and more.  They have collaborated with various professionals and companies to produce music, dance recitals, videos and even sports such as a figure skate, facing, basketball and synchronised swimming. They came to wide attention in 2008 with Daito Manabe's YouTube video and 2010 with Perfume's live concert at Tokyo Dome and have become a common sight at Ars Electronica and transmedia festivals around the world.

Origin
Rhizomatiks was founded as a collective of creative people in 2006 in Tokyo to work on large-scale commercial projects.< One early project was with the Japanese pop group Perfume, work with the single Polyrhythm in 2007, which led to touring with the band. They became widely noticed with a video piece in 2008 called Electric Stimulus To Face, which had more than a million YouTube hits in its first month.

The company has gone international, becoming a fixture at transmedia festivals around the world and has expanded its portfolio 10x.

In 2014, the collaborated with dance troupe Elevenplay, appearing at the Festival Internacional Cervantino. They also participated in the Art Fair Tokyo 2015, by displaying their "mega-synth system," which works like a regular synthesizer.

Members
Rhizomatiks is an eclectic combination of creators which includes architects, visual artists, media artists, designers, musicians, engineers and programmers.

The founder of the group is Daito Manabe (1976), an artist, composer, programmer, designer, DJ and VJ. Manabe is from a traditional media art environment, with a degree in dynamic sensory programming from the International Academy of Media Arts and Sciences and a degree in mathematics from the Tokyo University of Science.

The CTO of the group is Motoi Ishibashi (1976), an artist and engineer. Lives and works in Tokyo. Ishibashi studied control systems engineering at the Tokyo Institute of Technology, followed by mechanical and image processing engineering at the Institute of Advanced Media Arts and Sciences (IAMAS) in Gifu, at the inception of digital media production. He met Manabe at IAMAS, who was also a student there. He is currently working on the development of new artistic methods touching on both the visual environment and the elaboration of engineering solutions in terms of artistic production and interactive public spaces. In 2011, he and Manabe were the recipients of an Award of Distinction in the interactive art category of the Prix Ars Electronica. That same year, he received the Excellence Award at the 15th edition of the Japan Media Art Festival. Since 2015, he has co-directed Rhizomatiks Research along with Manabe, a strand devoted to research and development in the spheres of art, technology and entertainment.

Founding member Seiichi Saito (1975) studied architectural design At Columbia University  in New York and worked in advertising starting in 2000 before returning to Japan and joining Rhizomatiks. His is noted for this three-dimensional interactive commercial art work, based on architectural concepts. Today he is the director of the company and also lectures part-time at the Tokyo University of Science.

Other founding member is Hidenori Chiba, who has a background in website development. Currently his is in charge of web design, system engineering and programming.

Other members of the company include Satoshi Horii, Daisuke Nakahama, Hiroyasu Kimora, Sumito Kamoi, Ichiro Kojima, Youichi Sakamoto, Muryo Honma, Motoi Ishibashi and Keisuki Arikuni and more people.

Work and artistry
Rhizomatiks produces interactive materials with their work crossing the boundaries between design, art and entertainment. Projects often involved collecting massive amounts of data using motion capture, kinect controllers and sensors to track dance movements in order to recreate human forms and movements as 3-D representations in real time. They also use projection mapping, lasers, sonar, robots and even drones.

New ideas will cross between artistic and commercial projects. The commercial pieces tend to be on a larger scale because of funding. (Rhizomatiks) is like a music label, Manabe says. People with similar values gather and each person pursues different projects. Leadership changes from project to project.  They’re a challenging group of people, Shimizu says. Whether the project's commercial or noncommercial in nature, they aren’t able to stop trying something new. They are not just artists, they’re also Japanese craftsmen who focus on detail. This might also explain why they are essentially ‘process driven’ (in the way they approach projects).

References

Design companies of Japan
Entertainment companies of Japan
Mass media companies of Japan
Design companies established in 2006
Japanese companies established in 2006